Valle Gran Rey is a municipality in the western part of the island La Gomera, in the province of Santa Cruz de Tenerife of the Canary Islands, Spain. The Guanche name of the area was Orone.  The seat of the municipality since 1930 is La Calera; previously it was in Arure.

Valle Gran Rey borders the municipality of Vallehermoso to the east, while the Atlantic Ocean lies to the west.

Geography 
It is located in the west of the island, bordering the municipality of Vallehermoso. It has an extension of 32.36 km². The altitude of the municipal capital is about 50 meters above sea level, reaching a maximum altitude of 1,225 meters above sea level in the central summit of the island.

Subdivisions 
 Arure
 La Calera (seat)
 Casa de la Seda
 El Guro
 Las Hayas
 El Hornillo
 Taguluche
 La Playa
 Vueltas

Historical population

Notable natives and residents 
 Tim Hart (died 2009), English folk musician
 Oliver Weber, German photographer, physician and professor of visual arts

See also 
 List of municipalities in Santa Cruz de Tenerife

References

External links 

  Website Valle Gran Rey
 Blog La Gomera

Municipalities in La Gomera